Kostis Palamas (– 27 February 1943) was a Greek poet who wrote the words to the Olympic Hymn. He was a central figure of the Greek literary generation of the 1880s and one of the cofounders of the so-called New Athenian School (or Palamian School, or Second Athenian School) along with Georgios Drosinis and Ioannis Polemis.

Biography
Born in Patras, in the same house as born the Italian novelist Matilde Serao, he received his primary and secondary education in Mesolonghi. In 1877 he enrolled at the School of Law, Economics and Political Sciences of the University of Athens, but he soon abandoned his studies. In the 1880s, he worked as a journalist. He published his first collection of verses, Songs of My Fatherland, in 1886.

He was nominated for the Nobel Prize for Literature on 14 occasions, but never received it.

He held an administrative post at the University of Athens between 1897 and 1926, and died during the German occupation of Greece in World War II. His funeral was a major event of the Greek resistance: the funerary poem composed and recited by fellow poet Angelos Sikelianos roused the mourners and culminated in a demonstration of 100,000 people against Nazi occupation.

Work
Palamas wrote the lyrics to the Olympic Hymn, composed by Spyridon Samaras. It was first performed at the 1896 Summer Olympics, the first modern Olympic Games.  The Hymn was then shelved as each host city from then until the 1960 Winter Olympics commissioned an original piece for its celebration of the Games, but the version by Samaras and Palamas was declared the official Olympic Anthem in 1958 and has been performed at each celebration of the Games since the 1960 Winter Olympics.

Honors
The old administration building of the University of Athens, in central Athens, where his office was located, is now dedicated to him as the "Kostis Palamas Building" and houses the "Greek Theater Museum", as well as many temporary exhibitions.

Palamas has been informally called the "national" poet of Greece. He was an influential voice in Greek literature for more than 30 years, and greatly influenced the entire political-intellectual climate of his time. Romain Rolland considered him the greatest poet in Europe.

Works

Collections of poems
 Songs of my Fatherland (1886)
 Hymn to Athena (1889)
 Eyes of my Soul (1892)
 Iambs and Anapaests (1897)
 The Grave (1898)
 The Greetings of the Sun-born (1900)
 Ή Ασάλευτη Ζωή (The Motionless Life)(1904)
 Twelve Lays of the Gypsy (1907)
 The King's flute (1910)
 Yearnings of the Lagoon (1912)
 Satirical Exercises (1912)
 The State and Solitude (1912)
 Altars (1915)
 Extempora (1919)
 The 14 verses (1919)
 The 5 verses - The passionate secret whispers - The Wolves - Two flowers from afar (1925)
 Cowardly and Harsh verses (1928)
 The 3 Verse Cycle (1929)
 Passages and Greetings (1931)
 The Nights of Phemius (1935)
 Evening Fire (1944, posthumous edition by his son, Leander Palamas)

Prose
 Death of a Youth (novel, 1901)
 Novels (1920)

Theater
 The Thrice-noble (drama, 1903)

Criticism
Palamas was one of the most respected literary critics of his day, and instrumental in the reappraisal of the works of Andreas Kalvos, Dionysios Solomos and the "Ionian School" of poetry, Kostas Krystallis et al.

Translations
 The King's Flute, tr. T. P. Stephanides, G. C. Katsimbalis (1982) [Greek and English texts]
 The King's Flute, tr. F. Will (1967)
 The Twelve Lays of the Gypsy, tr. G. Thomson (1969)
 The Twelve Words of the Gypsy, tr. T. P. Stephanides, G. C. Katsimbalis (1974; repr. 1975)
 A Hundred Voices, tr. T. P. Stephanides, G. C. Katsimbalis (1976)
 Ruins, Grief, On The Trip You Are Taken, Rose Fragrance, tr. A. Moskios

References

External links
 
 
 
 

 
1859 births
1943 deaths
Writers from Patras
Modern Greek poets
Greek nationalists
Eastern Orthodox Christians from Greece
Greek dramatists and playwrights
New Athenian School
Members of the Academy of Athens (modern)
Poets from Achaea
Burials at the First Cemetery of Athens
19th-century Greek poets
20th-century Greek poets